Polaris Founder's Park is a pocket park in the Polaris area of Columbus (Delaware County), Ohio, United States. The  park is located between the office building at 8800 Lyra Drive and Interstate 71.

The park was built as a memorial to Robert C. Echele of the company Polaris Centers of Commerce who was inspirational in developing the  Polaris area.

See also

 List of parks in Columbus, Ohio

References

External links 

 POLARIS Centers of Commerce: News and Announcements: POLARIS Founders Park Opens

Parks in Columbus, Ohio
Geography of Columbus, Ohio
Pocket parks